Antonin Nikolayevich Sochnev (4 June 1924 in Yudino, Vologda Oblast – 24 June 2012 in Moscow) was a Soviet Russian football player and coach.

He served in the Navy in World War II on Marat battleship.

Honours
 Soviet Top League top scorer: 11 goals (1954).

References

External links
 

1924 births
People from Gryazovetsky District
Soviet military personnel of World War II
2012 deaths
Soviet footballers
FC Torpedo Moscow players
Soviet Top League players
Soviet football managers
SC Tavriya Simferopol managers
Association football forwards
FC Tekstilshchik Ivanovo players
Sportspeople from Vologda Oblast